The 2017 Men's NORCECA Volleyball Championship was the 25th edition of the tournament, and was held in Colorado Springs, United States from 26 September to 1 October 2017. The top three teams qualified for the 2018 FIVB Volleyball Men's World Championship, whereas the fourth and fifth ranked teams qualified for the 2018 World Championship NORCECA qualification final four.

Originally the 2017 NORCECA Championship was the only competition from the area to offer the 2018 World Championship qualification quota, but due to the pass of hurricanes Irma and Maria for the Caribbean sea, Cuba and Puerto Rico were unable to compete, NORCECA authorities decided to make the 2018 World Championship NORCECA qualification final four tournament - Cuba, Puerto Rico and the 4th and 5th placed teams of the 2017 NORCECA Championship.

Qualification
The top six ranked teams from the NORCECA Ranking as of 1 January 2016 qualified directly. Other six teams qualified through the zonal qualification.

Pools composition
Teams were seeded following the serpentine system according to their NORCECA Ranking as of 1 January 2017. Rankings are shown in brackets.

Squads

Venues
 OTC Sports Center I, Colorado Springs, United States – Pool A, B, 5th–8th semifinals and Final six
 OTC Sports Center II, Colorado Springs, United States – Pool C and 5th–10th places

Pool standing procedure
 Number of matches won
 Match points
 Points ratio
 Sets ratio
 Result of the last match between the tied teams

Match won 3–0: 5 match points for the winner, 0 match points for the loser
Match won 3–1: 4 match points for the winner, 1 match point for the loser
Match won 3–2: 3 match points for the winner, 2 match points for the loser

Preliminary round
All times are Mountain Daylight Time (UTC−06:00).

Pool A

Pool B

Pool C

Final round
All times are Mountain Daylight Time (UTC−06:00).

5th–10th places

5th–10th quarterfinals

5th–8th semifinals

9th place match

7th place match

5th place match

Final six

Quarterfinals

Semifinals

3rd place match

Final

Final standing

{| class="wikitable" style="text-align:center"
|-
!width=40|Rank
!width=250|Team
|- bgcolor=#ccffcc
|
|style="text-align:left"|
|- bgcolor=#ccffcc
|
|style="text-align:left"|
|- bgcolor=#ccffcc
|
|style="text-align:left"|
|- bgcolor=#dfefff
|4
|style="text-align:left"|
|- bgcolor=#dfefff
|5
|style="text-align:left"|
|-
|6
|style="text-align:left"|
|-
|7
|style="text-align:left"|
|-
|8
|style="text-align:left"|
|-
|9
|style="text-align:left"|
|-
|10
|style="text-align:left"|
|}

Awards

Most Valuable Player
 Micah Christenson
Best Scorer
 Alberto Blanco
Best Server
 Joann Breleur
Best Digger
 Luis Chávez
Best Receiver
 Jorge Barajas
Best Setter
 Pedro Rangel
Best Outside Spikers
 Aaron Russell
 Stephen Maar
Best Middle Blockers
 José Martínez
 Leonel Antonio Aragon
Best Opposite Spiker
 Sharone Vernon-Evans
Best Libero
 Luis Chávez

See also
2017 Women's NORCECA Volleyball Championship

References

External links
Official website
Regulations
Awards

Men's NORCECA Volleyball Championship
NORCECA
2017 in American sports
International volleyball competitions hosted by the United States
Volleyball in Colorado
2017 in sports in Colorado
Men's NORCECA Volleyball Championship
Men's NORCECA Volleyball Championship
Men's NORCECA Volleyball Championship